Nopporn Suppipat (born March 30, 1971) is a Thai businessman living in Paris. He is the largest investor in French tech start-up, Blade Group. Suppipat became known in Thailand as founder and CEO of Wind Energy Holding (WEH) which became South East Asia’s largest wind power business in 2014 with a valuation of $1.9 billion. Following the 2014 coup d'etat in Thailand he was forced to flee the country after being accused of lese majeste. He was granted political asylum by the French authorities and has now settled in Paris.

Early life
Nopporn Suppipat was born and raised in Bangkok, Thailand. He is the eldest son of two dentists. He moved to the US to attend high school and then undertook coursework for a BA at the University of Miami before eventually settling in Thailand.

Career

Suppipat first entered the business investing in the stock market as a freshman. With seed money of $2,850, he became a dollar millionaire at the age of 20. Within two years however, he lost most of his fortune.

He later invested in a 100MW conventional power plant, but his investment ended after Thailand's economic bubble burst and his partner decided to sell in 1998. After this, he set up a small magazine business.

In 2005, Suppipat turned his attention to renewable energy. He hired a research company to carry out a feasibility study about Thailand’s wind resources and in 2006 he launched Renewable Energy Corporation (REC).

In 2009, Suppipat launched Wind Energy Holding (WEH) with REC as the holding company and Pradej Kitti-itsaranon, the head of the SET-listed engineering group Demco Plc as a minority shareholder. He launched two sites in the northeastern province of Isan with a capacity to produce 207 megawatts of power, and with more projects in the pipeline. WEH grew to become Southeast Asia’s largest wind energy company valued at $1.2 billion with preparations for an initial public offering.

In June 2014, Suppipat was listed number 31 on Forbes Asia’s ranking of Thailand’s 50 Richest with a net worth of $800 million.

Controversy and exile

In the aftermath of the 2014 military coup, Suppipat was charged with violating Thailand’s strict lese majeste laws in connection with the graft investigation that implicated relatives of former Thai Princess Srirasmi.  After discovering he would be charged under lese majeste law, which carries a sentence of up to 15 years on each count, Suppipat travelled to Cambodia on November 30, 2014, stating: “I knew '112' (lese majeste charge) would mean I wouldn't get bail... I couldn't take that risk."  Suppipat has protested his innocence and claims the charges against him were politically motivated because authorities perceived him to be close to former Prime Minister Thaksin Shinawatra. Suppipat is known among prominent Thai academics for being pro-democracy. Suppipat has been granted political asylum by the French authorities and is currently living in Paris.

Sale of WEH to KPN Group

Almost immediately after leaving Thailand, Suppipat stood down as the CEO of WEH and was replaced by former co-chief executive Emma Collins. On June 25, 2015, Suppipat sold his 75% majority stake to KPN Group with the management team of WEH becoming the minority shareholders in the company.

In 2015, KPN had been accused of mishandling WEH funds, which surfaced after a former company accountant Asama Thanyaphan claimed to have been forced to falsify the accounts to conceal the withdrawals from shareholders. KPMG, the external auditor for WEH, resigned shortly afterwards, refusing to endorse the 2015 accounts. Grant Thornton was appointed as WEH's auditor and were made aware of all of the allegations.

The allegations were flatly denied by KPN and Wind Energy Holding as they stated that all business activities have always been carried out in a lawful manner. Furthermore, Grant Thornton has issued unqualified accounts for WEH for 2015 and 2016. WEH has continued to thrive since the sale to KPN having recently raised US$1.14 billion of financing for its five windfarm projects in one of the single largest onshore wind farm financings globally. WEH has also signed 450 MW of turbine supply agreements with Vestas and GE for its five wind farms which will host the tallest turbines in Southeast Asia to date. Once complete, the five projects will make WEH the single largest wind farm operator in Southeast Asia.

Investment in Blade Group

Since moving to France, Suppipat has invested in French startup Blade Group which is developing a new type of Cloud computer called Shadow (service) and which is being marketed as “The PC of the Future.” On June 14, 2017 Blade announced a €51 million capital increase with Suppipat, the largest investor, joining the company's Strategic Committee. On November 21 Blade announced it expects to launch the service to U.S. customers at the beginning of 2018.

References

1971 births
Living people
Nopporn Suppipat
Nopporn Suppipat
Nopporn Suppipat
Nopporn Suppipat
Nopporn Suppipat